The men's 400 metre freestyle event at the 2016 Summer Olympics took place on 6 August at the Olympic Aquatics Stadium.

Summary
China's Sun Yang fell short of his attempt to a back-to-back gold in one of the program's long-distance freestyle races due to an upset performance from Australia's Mack Horton. Heading into the final lap with a narrow 0.14-second lead, Horton managed to hold off the fast-charging Sun towards the finish for his first individual gold medal in 3:41.55. Unable to catch his Aussie rival near the wall by 13-hundredths of a second, Sun settled for the silver in 3:41.68. Meanwhile, Gabriele Detti picked up the bronze with a time of 3:43.49 to become Italy's first male Olympic medalist in swimming since 2000.

Conor Dwyer (3:44.01), the fastest swimmer headed into the final, and fellow American Connor Jaeger (3:44.16) finished off the podium in fourth and fifth respectively, separated by a 0.15-second margin. Great Britain's James Guy led the pack towards the halfway mark under a world record pace, but faded to sixth in 3:44.68. Horton's teammate David McKeon (3:45.28) and France's Jordan Pothain (3:49.07) rounded out the field.

South Korean swimmer and Beijing 2008 champion Park Tae-hwan, as well as Canada's long distance ace Ryan Cochrane, did not advance to the final, finishing tenth and eleventh in the prelims.

Records
Prior to this competition, the existing world and Olympic records were as follows.

Competition format

The competition consisted of two rounds: heats and a final. The swimmers with the best 8 times in the heats advanced to the final. Swim-offs were used as necessary to break ties for advancement to the next round.

Results

Heats
The heats began at 1:48pm.

ƒ False start, but allowed to continue at referee's discretion.

Final
The final began at 10:30pm.

References

Men's 00400 metre freestyle
Olympics
Men's events at the 2016 Summer Olympics